Love in Disguise. is a 2010 Chinese-language musical romantic comedy movie. It is Taiwanese-American singer-songwriter, record producer, actor and film director Wang Leehom's directorial debut, and was filmed in Shanghai. Love in Disguise went on to become the highest-grossing film for a first-time director in Chinese history grossing over 60 million RMB domestically.

Plot
Du Minghan, a popular star singer, decides to let go of his fame and head for a normal life when he meets Song Xiaoqing, a student from a music academy. Du gradually falls for her and has to juggle his career and double identity by going undercover at Song's music academy.

Cast
 Wang Leehom as Du Minghan
 Liu Yifei as Song Xiaoqing
 Joan Chen as Joan
 Zeng Yike as Xiaotao
 Qiao Zhenyu as Mu Fan
 Chen Han-dian as Wei Zhibo
 Xie Yuan as Song Xiaoqing's father
 Xie Na as fashion designer
 Khalil Fong as himself
 Lang Tsu-yun

References

External links
 

Taiwanese romantic comedy films
2010 films
Films set in Shanghai
2010 romantic comedy films
Chinese-language films
Chinese romantic comedy films
2010 directorial debut films
Hong Kong romantic comedy films
2010s Mandarin-language films
2010s Hong Kong films